Bazzania is a genus of liverwort in the family Lepidoziaceae.

The genus name of Bazzania is in honour of Matteo Bazzani (1674-1749), an Italian botanist and professor of Anatomy from the University of Bologna.

Species and subspecies 
It contains the following species:

Accepted:
 Bazzania acanthostipa Spruce
 Bazzania accreta (Lehm. & Lindenb.) Trevis. 	 
 Bazzania acinaciformis Steph. 
 Bazzania acuminata (Lindenb. & Gottsche) Trevis. 
 Bazzania acutifolia (Steph.) Schiffn. 
 Bazzania adnexa (Lehm. & Lindenb.) Trevis.
 Bazzania adnexa var. aucklandica (Lindenb. & Gottsche) J.J.Engel & G.L.Merr. 
 Bazzania affinis (Lindenb. & Gottsche) Trevis.
 Bazzania albifolia Horik.
 Bazzania alpina (Stephani) Tixier 
 Bazzania ambigua (Lindenb.) Trevis.
 Bazzania ambigua subsp. ovifolia (Stephani) S.Hatt.
 Bazzania amblyphylla Meagher
 Bazzania ancistrodes Spruce
 Bazzania aneityensis (Steph.) Tixier
 Bazzania angusta (Stephani) Tixier
 Bazzania angustifolia Horik.
 Bazzania angustisedens (Steph.) N. Kitag. 	 
 Bazzania angustistipula . Kitag.
 Bazzania aoyagiana (Stephani) S.Hatt.
 Bazzania appendiculata (Mitt.) S.Hatt.
 Bazzania approximata Onr.
 Bazzania arcuata (Lindenb. & Gottsche) Trevis.
 Bazzania armatistipula (Steph.) Fulford 	 
 Bazzania asperrima Steph.
 Bazzania assamica (Stephani) S.Hatt.
 Bazzania asymmetrica (Stephani) N.Kitag.
 Bazzania aterrima (Stephani) N.Kitag.
 Bazzania aurescens Spruce 
 Bazzania australis (Mont.) Trevis.
 Bazzania avia Meagher
 Bazzania azorica H. Buch & Perss.
 Bazzania bescherellei (Stephani) Tixier
 Bazzania bhutanica N.Kitag. & Grolle 
 Bazzania bicrenata N.Kitag.
 Bazzania bidens (Gottsche & Lindenb.) Trevis.
 Bazzania bidentula (Stephani) Stephani ex Yasuda
 Bazzania bilobata N.Kitag.
 Bazzania borbonica (Stephani) Stephani
 Bazzania boschiana (Stephani) S.W.Arnell
 Bazzania breuteliana (Lindenb. & Gottsche) Trevis.
 Bazzania brevidens (Stephani) S.Hatt.
 Bazzania cadens N. Kitag.
 Bazzania callida (Sande Lac. ex Stephani) Abeyw.
 Bazzania ceylanica (Mitt.) W.E.Nicholson
 Bazzania chilensis (Steph.) Spruce
 Bazzania chimborazensis Spruce
 Bazzania citharodes Meagher
 Bazzania comorensis Stephani
 Bazzania confertissima (Steph.) H.A.Mill.
 Bazzania conistipula (Stephani) H.A.Mill.
 Bazzania conophylla (Sande Lac.) Schiffner
 Bazzania consociata (Stephani) H.A.Mill.
 Bazzania corbieri (Stephani) Meagher 
 Bazzania cordifolia (Stephani) S. Hatt.
 Bazzania cordistipula (Mont.) Trevis.
 Bazzania coreana (Stephani) S.Hatt.
 Bazzania cubensis (Gottsche ex Stephani) Pagan
 Bazzania cucullata Onr.
 Bazzania cucullistipula (Stephani) S.Hatt.
 Bazzania cuneistipula (Gottsche, Lindenb. & Nees) Trevis.
 Bazzania curvidens Stephani
 Bazzania debilis N.Kitag.
 Bazzania decidua Spruce
 Bazzania deciduifolia Onr.
 Bazzania decrescens (Lehm. & Lindenb.) Trevis.
 Bazzania decrescens subsp. molleri (Stephani) E.W.Jones
 Bazzania decrescens subsp. pumila (Mitt.) Pocs
 Bazzania decurva (Nees) Trevis.
 Bazzania denticulata (Lindenb. & Gottsche) Trevis.
 Bazzania denticulifera Mägd.
 Bazzania denudata (Torr. ex Gottsche, Lindenb. & Nees) Trevis.
 Bazzania deplanchei (Gottsche ex Stephani) Jovet-Ast
 Bazzania diversicuspis Spruce 
 Bazzania engelii Glenny 
 Bazzania erosa (Reinw., Blume & Nees) Trevis.
 Bazzania exempta J.J.Engel
 Bazzania falcata (Lindenb.) Trevis.
 Bazzania falcifolia (Steph.) H.A.Mill.
 Bazzania fasciculata (Stephani) Meagher
 Bazzania fauriana (Stephani) S.Hatt.
 Bazzania fissifolia (Stephani) Stephani ex Yasuda
 Bazzania fissifolia f. hamata (Stephani) S.Hatt.
 Bazzania flaccida (Dumort.) Grolle
 Bazzania flavicans Spruce
 Bazzania fleischeri (Stephani) Abeyw.
 Bazzania friabilis N.Kitag. & T.Kodama
 Bazzania fuhreri Meagher
 Bazzania gamscottii Meagher
 Bazzania gaudichaudii (Gottsche ex Stephani) Schiffner
 Bazzania gibbifolia (Stephani) S.Hatt.
 Bazzania gracilis (Hampe & Gottsche) Stephani
 Bazzania grandistipula (Stephani) Abeyw.
 Bazzania griffithiana (Stephani) Mizut. 
 Bazzania gunniana (Stephani) H.A.Mill.
 Bazzania hamatifolia (Stephani) H.A.Mill.
 Bazzania hebridensis (Stephani) H.A.Mill.
 Bazzania heteroclada Spruce
 Bazzania himalayana (Mitt.) Schiffner 
 Bazzania hookeri (Lindenb.) Trevis.
 Bazzania humifusa Spruce 
 Bazzania imbricata S. Hatt.
 Bazzania indigenara (Stephani) N.Kitag.
 Bazzania integra (Nees & Mont.) Stephani
 Bazzania integristipula (Steph.) H.A.Mill.
 Bazzania intermedia (Lindenb. & Gottsche) Trevis.
 Bazzania involuta (Mont.) Trevis. 
 Bazzania involuta var. submutica (Lindenb. & Gottsche) J.J.Engel & G.L.Merr.
 Bazzania jamaicensis (Lehm. & Lindenb.) Trevis.
 Bazzania japonica (Sande Lac.) Lindb.
 Bazzania jishibae (Stephani) S.Hatt.
 Bazzania kiushiana S.Hatt. 
 Bazzania kokawana N. Kitag. & T.Kodama
 Bazzania koyasana (Stephani) S.Hatt.
 Bazzania lacerostipula (Stephani) Abeyw.
 Bazzania lancifolia (Stephani) Herzog
 Bazzania latidens (Gottsche ex Stephani) Fulford
 Bazzania laxifolia (Stephani) Demaret
 Bazzania leptostipa Spruce 
 Bazzania leratii (Beauverd) H.A.Mill.
 Bazzania lessonii (Stephani) H.A.Mill.
 Bazzania liebmanniana (Lindenb. & Gottsche) Trevis.
 Bazzania longa (Nees) Trevis.
 Bazzania longistipula (Lindenb.) Trevis.
 Bazzania loricata (Reinw., Blume & Nees) Trevis.
 Bazzania magna Horik.
 Bazzania magnistipula N.Kitag.
 Bazzania manillana (Gottsche) S.Hatt. 
 Bazzania mascarena (Stephani) Herzog
 Bazzania mayebarae S.Hatt.
 Bazzania minutiserra (Stephani) N.Kitag.
 Bazzania mittenii (Steph.) Steph.
 Bazzania monilinervis (Lehm. & Lindenb.) Trevis.
 Bazzania morokensis (Stephani) Grolle 
 Bazzania mutans (Herzog) O.Yano
 Bazzania nagasakiensis (Stephani) S.Hatt.
 Bazzania nitida (F.Weber) Grolle
 Bazzania nudicaulis A. Evans
 Bazzania obcuneata (Stephani) H.A. Mill.
 Bazzania oblonga (Mitt.) Schiffner
 Bazzania obtusata (Taylor) Kuntze
 Bazzania okamurana (Stephani) S.Hatt.
 Bazzania okaritana Meagher & D.Glenny
 Bazzania oleosa Grolle
 Bazzania orbanii Pócs 
 Bazzania oshimensis (Stephani) Horik.
 Bazzania ovifolia (Stephani) S.Hatt.
 Bazzania ovifolia var. vastifolia (Stephani) S.Hatt.
 Bazzania ovistipula (Stephani) Abeyw.
 Bazzania palmatifida (Stephani) Grolle
 Bazzania parisii (Stephani) N.Kitag.
 Bazzania patentistipa (Sande Lac.) Schiffner
 Bazzania paucidens (Stephani) H.A.Mill.
 Bazzania pearsonii Stephani
 Bazzania perfalcata N.Kitag.
 Bazzania perrotana E.W.Jones
 Bazzania peruviana (Nees) Trevis. 
 Bazzania phyllobola Spruce
 Bazzania platycnema (Schwägr. ex Stephani) H.A.Mill.
 Bazzania pompeana (Sande Lac.) Mitt.
 Bazzania pompeana var. uedae (Iisiba) S.Hatt.
 Bazzania praerupta (Reinw., Blume & Nees) Trevis.
 Bazzania pseudotriangularis Horik.
 Bazzania pseudovittata N.Kitag. & T.Kodama
 Bazzania pulchella (Stephani) H.A.Mill.
 Bazzania pusilla (Stephani) S.Hatt.
 Bazzania quadrata (Colenso) W.Martin & E.A.Hodgs.
 Bazzania quadratistipula H.A. Mill.
 Bazzania quadricrenata (Gottsche ex Stephani) Pagan
 Bazzania rabenhorstii (Stephani) Abeyw.
 Bazzania recurvolimbata (Stephani) N.Kitag.
 Bazzania reflexa (Gottsche) Stephani
 Bazzania remotifolia Horik. 
 Bazzania revoluta (Stephani) N.Kitag.
 Bazzania rimosa Meagher
 Bazzania robusta Spruce
 Bazzania rotundistipula (Stephani) Abeyw.
 Bazzania sandei (Stephani) Schiffner
 Bazzania sauropoda Meagher
 Bazzania scalaris Meagher
 Bazzania schismoidea (Stephani) Stephani
 Bazzania schlimiana (Gottsche) Fulford
 Bazzania schultze-motelii N.Kitag.
 Bazzania schusterana N.Kitag.
 Bazzania semiopaca N.Kitag.
 Bazzania serrulatoides Horik.
 Bazzania shusensica (Stephani) S.Hatt.
 Bazzania sikkimensis (Stephani) Herzog
 Bazzania spinigera Spruce 
 Bazzania spinosa S.Okamura 
 Bazzania spiralis (Reinw., Blume & Nees) Meijer
 Bazzania squarrosa (Stephani) H.A.Mill.
 Bazzania stephanii (J.B.Jack) Stephani
 Bazzania stolonifera (Sw.) Trevis.
 Bazzania stresemannii (Herzog) N.Kitag.
 Bazzania stricta (Stephani) Abeyw.
 Bazzania subaequitexta (Stephani) N.Kitag.
 Bazzania subserrifolia (Beauverd) H.A.Mill. 
 Bazzania succulenta N.Kitag.
 Bazzania sumbavensis (Gottsche ex Stephani) Stephani
 Bazzania taleana (Gottsche) Fulford 
 Bazzania temariana (Stephani) H.A.Mill.
 Bazzania teretiuscula (Lindenb. & Gottsche) Trevis.
 Bazzania tessellata Meagher 
 Bazzania tiaoloensis Mizut. & G.C.Zhang
 Bazzania tricrenata (Wahlenb.) Trevis. 
 Bazzania tridens (Reinw., Blume & Nees) Trevis.
 Bazzania tridens var. assamica (Stephani) Pocs
 Bazzania tridens var. cornutistipula (Stephani) Pocs
 Bazzania tridens f. minutissima (Kamim.) Pocs
 Bazzania tridens var. oshimensis (Stephani) Pocs
 Bazzania tridenticulata Horik.
 Bazzania trilobata (L.) Gray
 Bazzania trilobata var. depauperata (Müll.Hal.) Grolle
 Bazzania uncigera (Reinw., Blume & Nees) Trevis.
 Bazzania upoluensis (Steph.) H.A.Mill.
 Bazzania vietnamica Pocs
 Bazzania vincentina Spruce
 Bazzania viridissima Spruce
 Bazzania vittata (Gottsche) Trevis.
 Bazzania wallichiana (Lindenb.) Trevis.
 Bazzania wattsiana (Stephani) Meagher
 Bazzania yoshinagana (Stephani) Stephani ex Yasuda
 Bazzania zonulata Meagher
Unresolved:
 Bazzania angustistipula N.Kitag.
 Bazzania chimantensis Fulford
 Bazzania fuscescens A.Evans
 Bazzania hattoriana Kamim.
 Bazzania kanemarui S.Hatt.
 Bazzania macgregorii Stephani
 Bazzania opulistipa Herzog
 Bazzania parvitexta Stephani
 Bazzania patulistipula S.Hatt.
 Bazzania platyphylla S.Hatt.
 Bazzania pulvinata Stephani
 Bazzania roccatii Gola
 Bazzania semiconnata var. minor (Iisiba) S.Hatt.
 Bazzania spruceana Stephani
 Bazzania trigona S.Hatt.

References 

Jungermanniales genera
Lepidoziaceae
Taxonomy articles created by Polbot